Obesotoma okutanii is a species of sea snail, a marine gastropod mollusk in the family Mangeliidae.

Description
The length of the shell attains 4.6 mm.

Distribution
This species occurs in the Sea of Japan and off Labrador, Canada.

References

 Hasegawa, K., Okutani, T. and E. Tsuchida (2000) Family Turridae. In: Okutani, T. (ed.), Marine Mollusks in Japan. Tokai University Press, Tokyo, 619–667 (in Japanese).

External links
  Tucker, J.K. 2004 Catalog of recent and fossil turrids (Mollusca: Gastropoda). Zootaxa 682:1–1295.
 Biolib.cz: Obesotoma okutanii

okutanii
Gastropods described in 1992